Amadou Ouattara (born 30 December 1990) is an Ivorian professional footballer who plays for Thai League 1 club Chonburi as a winger.

External links
 Player profile at PTT Rayong Official Website
Côte d'Ivoire - A. Ouattara - Profile with news, career statistics and history - Soccerway

References

1989 births
Living people
Ivorian footballers
Expatriate footballers in Thailand
Ivorian expatriate sportspeople in Thailand
Place of birth missing (living people)
Association football wingers
Moss FK players
Amadou Ouattara
Amadou Ouattara
Amadou Ouattara
Amadou Ouattara